The Canadian House of Commons Standing Committee on Environment and Sustainable Development (ENVI) is a standing committee in the House of Commons of Canada.

Mandate
Reviewing policies, programs and legislation involving: 
Environment and Climate Change Canada
Parks Canada
Impact Assessment Act
Impact Assessment Agency of Canada
Species at Risk Act
Migratory Birds Convention Act
Canada Water Act
Canada Wildlife Act
the pollution prevention provisions of the Fisheries Act
Studying the reports of the Commissioner of the Environment and Sustainable Development

Membership

Subcommittees
Subcommittee on Agenda and Procedure (SENV)

External links
 House of Commons Standing Committee on Environment and Sustainable Development

Environment
Environment of Canada
Environmental policy